TT-Line Company Pty Ltd, better known by its trading name Spirit of Tasmania is a company which has been operating ferries from mainland Australia to Tasmania since July 1985. The company was separated from the Tasmanian Government's Department of Transport in 1993, becoming a government business enterprise wholly owned by the Government of Tasmania where it was then named Spirit of Tasmania in August 1993.

History

1985-1992
TT-Line (Tasmania) was formed in 1985 following the announcement that the Australian National Line (ANL) would no longer operate a service across Bass Strait with Empress of Australia.

After the cessation of ANL operations to Tasmania, the Tasmanian Government's Department of Transport began a replacement ferry service, purchasing the West German ferry Nils Holgersson (3) for $26 million. That amount was offset by a payment from the Australian federal government in compensation for placing the environmentally-sensitive Gordon River off-limits to Hydro Tasmania power generation schemes. The Nils Holgersson (3) was renamed Abel Tasman on 21 April 1985, and set sail for Australia, she arrived in Devonport on 20 June and began operating on 1 July 1985 from Melbourne's Station Pier.

1993–2001 
In 1993, TT-Line Tasmania replaced the aging Abel Tasman with another ex TT-Line ferry. The new ship, Peter Pan (3), had replaced the former Nils Holgersson (3) (now Abel Tasman) on the Travemünde to Trelleborg route in Germany in 1986. The ship, which was delivered to Lloyd Werft shipyard in September 1993 and was renamed Spirit of Tasmania, cost the Government $150 million. The ferry left Germany on 5 October and arrived in Devonport 12 November.

On 1 November 1993, operation of the service was transferred from the Tasmanian Department of Transport to TT-Line Pty Ltd, a government business enterprise wholly owned by the Tasmanian Government.

Spirit of Tasmania made her first commercial crossing of Bass Strait on the night of 29 November 1993 and on that morning Abel Tasman was laid-up and offered for sale, which was completed in April 1994, to Ventouris Ferries as Pollux.

While Spirit of Tasmania was dry-docked in 1997, the TT-Line chartered a large multi-hull ferry, Incat 045 (now Condor Rapide), from Incat, dubbing her Tascat. She was used for two weeks as an experiment. In the peak season of 1997/98. TT-Line chartered Incat 046 to operate as Devil Cat from the old SeaCat Tasmania terminal in George Town to Station Pier. TT-Line repeated this over the 1998/99 peak season with the new Incat 050 Devil Cat (also marketed under the name Devil Cat).

In September 1999, Spirit of Tasmania was forced out of action for two weeks due to fuel contamination, and TT-Line chartered the Incat 030 HSC Condor 10 which at the time was laid up in New Zealand as Lynx. Once TT-Line arranged for the charter she immediately departed New Zealand and arrived in Tasmania two days later, and entered service to cover for Spirit of Tasmania. Over the 1999/00 summer season, TT-Line again charted a fast craft while the former Devil Cat Incat 046 was used on the Georgetown-Melbourne route during this peak period for three successive years.

2002-2006

In 2002, the Tasmanian Government and TT-Line announced that they would be replacing Devil Cat and Spirit of Tasmania with two Finnish built monohull ferries Superfast III and Superfast IV later that year from Superfast Ferries. Both were handed over at the Neorion shipyard on the island of Syros where they had been refitted. Superfast III was renamed Spirit of Tasmania II and departed on 6 July and Superfast IV renamed Spirit of Tasmania I and departed 7 July. They set off for Australia both arriving in Hobart 29 July where the final touches were put into place. After public inspections at Hobart, Melbourne and Devonport, the two new ships set sail on 1 September Spirit of Tasmania I from Devonport and Spirit of Tasmania II from Melbourne.

Earlier that day Spirit of Tasmania arrived in Melbourne for the last time, having crossed Bass Strait 2,849 times and carried a total of 2.3 million passengers, 807,000 cars and 185,000 containers. Spirit of Tasmania departed Melbourne just before midnight on 5 September headed for Sydney where she arrived on 7 September. In late December it was announced that the ship had been sold to Fjord Line.

In March 2003, it was announced that TT-Line would begin operating a third ship, Spirit of Tasmania III, from Devonport to Sydney in early 2004. The last service from Sydney to Tasmania operated by Australian Trader had ceased in 1976. The new ship was also ex Superfast Ferries having been built as Superfast II in 1995. Superfast II was handed over to TT-Line 30 September and went to the Nerion yard for refitting after the works and renaming to Spirit of Tasmania III, she set off on the evening of 10 October. She arrived in Hobart on 30 October berthing No. 6 Macquarie wharf for more fitting-out to be done. Spirit of Tasmania III set out for a voyage from Hobart to Devonport with 500 people aboard. She stayed in Devonport for a day and then moved on to Melbourne then to Sydney. Spirit of Tasmania III debuted on the Sydney to Devonport run on 13 January 2004.

On 5 June 2006, the Tasmanian government announced that the Sydney to Devonport service would cease on 28 August and the ship sold. It was announced 11 July 2006 that Spirit of Tasmania III had been sold to Corsica Ferries; she has now been renamed Mega Express Four.

2007-present
In December 2017, TT-Line announced it planned to replace the existing ferries with new builds. The new vessels were to have a passenger capacity increase of 43% and freight capacity increase of 39% over the existing ferries. In January 2018, it was announced that the German Flensburger Schiffbau-Gesellschaft (FSG) would build the two new vessels, with the first expected to enter service in 2021.

In February 2020, it was announced that the contract with FSG had been mutually cancelled. A new contract for construction of the new ships has been signed with Rauma Marine Constructions of Finland. In July 2020, it was announced that the proposed contract with Rauma Marine Constructions would not proceed, due to uncertainty arising from the COVID-19 pandemic. In 2021, the Tasmanian government announced negotiations had resumed with Rauma Marine, with the contract being signed in April 2021.

On the 23 October 2022, TT-Line moved its Victorian terminal from Station Pier to a new facility at Spirit of Tasmania Quay, Geelong.

Fleet

Current fleet

Future ships

Former ships

See also
Bass Strait ferries

References

Books:
Ferry to Tasmania, A short History by Peter Plowman, .
Super-Ferries of Britain, Europe and Scandinavia by Russell Plummer, .

Internet:
Fakta Om Fartyg (Facts on Ships, Swedish)
 The ferry site
TT-line annual report 09/10
TT-Line Company Pty Ltd appoints new CEO
Ferries of Tasmania, Information and photos on TT-Line company and their ships

External links

 Spirit of Tasmania
 Information and photos of TT-Line Tasmania ferries
 Photos of TT-line ships
 TT-line on Fakta om Fartyg (Swedish)

Bass Strait ferries
Australian companies established in 1993
Ferry companies of Tasmania
Government-owned companies of Tasmania
Transport companies established in 1993